The canton of Neuvy-Saint-Sépulchre is an administrative division of the Indre department, central France. Its borders were modified at the French canton reorganisation which came into effect in March 2015. Its seat is in Neuvy-Saint-Sépulchre.

It consists of the following communes:
 
Aigurande
La Buxerette
Buxières-d'Aillac
Chassignolles
Cluis
Crevant
Crozon-sur-Vauvre
Fougerolles
Gournay
Lourdoueix-Saint-Michel
Lys-Saint-Georges
Le Magny
Maillet
Malicornay
Mers-sur-Indre
Montchevrier
Montgivray
Montipouret
Mouhers
Neuvy-Saint-Sépulchre
Orsennes
Saint-Denis-de-Jouhet
Saint-Plantaire
Sarzay
Tranzault

References

Cantons of Indre